The 4th Mountain Artillery Regiment ) was a field artillery regiment of the Italian Army, specializing in mountain combat. Since their formation the Mountain Artillery Regiments have served alongside the Alpini, a mountain infantry corps of the Italian Army, that distinguished itself in combat during World War I and World War II. The Alpini and Mountain Artillery regiments share, besides their close history, the distinctive Cappello Alpino.

The regiment was constituted in 1934. The regimental motto was: "Su tutte l'erte e sopra ogni cima". It consisted of the following units:

 4th Mountain Artillery Regiment HQ based in Cuneo
 Command Company in Cuneo
 "Pinerolo" Alpine Artillery Group in Beinette
  7th Battery in Beinette
  8th Battery in Borgo San Dalmazzo
  9th Battery in Boves
 Ammunition and Supply Company in Crava
 "Mondovì" Alpine Artillery Group in Mondovì
  10th Battery in Villanova Mondovì
  11th Battery in Mondovì
  12th Battery in Villanova Mondovì
 Ammunition and Supply Company in Magliano Alpi
 "Val Po'" Alpine Artillery Group in Piasco
  64th Battery in Boves
  72nd Battery in Piasco
  73rd Battery in Verzuolo
  116th Battery in Boves
 Ammunition and Supply Company in Manta

The regiment was sent with the 4th Cuneense Alpine Division to fight in the Soviet Union during World War II and was destroyed during the Soviet Operation Little Saturn in January 1943. 379 of the regiment's 3,897 men survived the Soviet offensive; none of the soldiers of the Artillery Group Mondovì survived.

External links
 4th Mountain Artillery Regiment on vecio.it page is in Italian

Alpini
Regiments of Italy in World War I
Regiments of Italy in World War II
Artillery regiments of Italy
Military units and formations established in 1934